Gap junction beta-4 protein (GJB4), also known as connexin 30.3 (Cx30.3) — is a protein that in humans is encoded by the GJB4 gene.

References

Further reading

Connexins